Veseloye is a former Russian Navy Black Sea Fleet airbase located near Krasnohvardiiske, Krasnohvardiiske Raion, Crimea, Ukraine

The base was used by the following units:
 HQ of 2nd Guards Maritime Missile Aviation Division (1952-57)
 5th Guards Maritime Missile Aviation Regiment (1960-94)
 981st Maritime Torpedo Aviation Regiment (1952-60)

References

Airports in Crimea
Military facilities in Crimea
Installations of the Russian Navy
Ukrainian airbases